Irma Palmieri (30 December 1932 – 19 March 2015) was a Venezuelan actress and comedian, known primarily for her work as Hortensia on the "Flora & Hortensia" radio sketches.

Career
Her career began on radio, where she garnered fame with her comedic voice work on Radio Rumbos. The character of Pepito Preguntón was created for her by Pedro E. Belisario. She later became nationally famous for the elderly spinster character of Hortensia, who lived her friend Flora (Nelly Pujols). Sketches featuring the two characters were broadcast as part of the comedy series Kiko Botones on Radio Rochela during the 1980s.

Death
Palmieri died at age 83 on 19 March 2015, at a local hospital in Caracas.The cause of death was surgery complications from a brain tumor.

Filmography

References

External links 

1931 births
2015 deaths
Venezuelan film actresses
Venezuelan stage actresses
Actresses from Caracas